Riverside is an unincorporated community in Hanson County, in the U.S. state of South Dakota.

History
Riverside was named in 1899 from its location near the James River. A post office was established at Riverside in 1899, and remained in operation until it was discontinued in 1920.

References

Unincorporated communities in Hanson County, South Dakota
Unincorporated communities in South Dakota